Jask County is in Hormozgan province, Iran. The capital of the county is the city of Jask. At the 2006 census, the county's population was 75,769 in 16,667 households. The following census in 2011 counted 52,882 people in 11,819 households, by which time Bashagard District had been separated from the county to become Bashagard County. At the 2016 census, the county's population was 58,884 in 15,211 households.

Administrative divisions

The population history and structural changes of Jask County's administrative divisions over three consecutive censuses are shown in the following table. The latest census shows two districts, five rural districts, and one city.

References

 

Counties of Hormozgan Province